Anigozanthos manglesii, commonly known as the red-and-green kangaroo paw, Mangles' kangaroo paw, Kurulbrang (Noongar), is a plant species endemic to Western Australia, and the floral emblem of that state.

The flower has become symbolic of the region. The display between August and November is remarkable for the high standing flowers occurring in urban and coastal regions.  The species is not threatened, but is protected under state legislation. A license is required for collection from the wild. It is desirable as a cut flower, possessing an unusual form and striking colours that last well.

Description
A member of the Anigozanthos genus, Anigozanthos manglesii is a rhizotomous perennial with long, grey-green linear leaves around 30 to 60 cm long.  The leaves extended from a central point at ground level. Its red and green flowers appear at the end of long stalks between August and November.  The flowers display in a sequence from the lowest point, those following are in a progression of development.  The spent flower-stalks may remain well after their season. The length of these stalks from the base is up to 1200 mm tall.

Distribution

The species is widely distributed throughout the Southwest Australian biogeographic regions, preferring white, yellow or grey sand, or sandy loam. The occurrence is confirmed in the northernmost part of its range in the Geraldton Sandplains and the Swan Coastal Plain near Perth. Extensive records also exist of occurrence in Jarrah Forest and Warren region to the south, but not reaching the southern coasts. It extends inland to the Avon Wheatbelt.

Taxonomy
The species was first described by a Scottish botanist David Don in 1834 from the type specimen:

There are two recognised subspecies as follows:
Anigozanthos manglesii subsp. quadrans Hopper
Distribution of the subspecies is as far north as Shark Bay, variation in habit and structure of the subspecies is otherwise discrete.
Anigozanthos manglesii D.Don subsp. manglesii
Wide occurrence as far north as Gingin and to Cape Leeuwin in the south.

Anigozanthos manglesii is known to hybridize naturally with other Anigozanthos species:
 A. viridis – progeny have been named Anigozanthos manglesii var. × angustifolius Lindl. and Anigozanthos manglesii var. × virescens Ostenf.
A. bicolor
A. kalbarriensis
A. humilis

Cultivars
Anigozanthos manglesii is often artificially hybridized with A. flavidus and to a lesser extent A. rufus. Cultivars include:

Autumn Mystery  -  A. manglesii x A. flavidus
Big Red - A. manglesii x A. flavidus
Bush Emerald -  A. manglesii x A. flavidus
Hickman's Delight -  A. manglesii x A. flavidus
Rogue Radiance -  (A. manglesii x  A. rufus) x A. flavidus
Space Age -  A manglesii x A. flavidus
Sue Dixon -  (A. manglesii x  A. rufus) x A. flavidus

Cultivation
In temperate regions this plant is either grown under glass or outdoors with the winter protection of a mulch. The species germinates readily from seed. As plants generally deteriorate after the second season, they are best treated as biennial. Watering should be withheld during the dormant period. They are susceptible to fungal ink spot disease and the leaves are attractive to snails. They are often used as cut flowers, due to their unique appearance and lasting qualities.

This plant has gained the Royal Horticultural Society's Award of Garden Merit.

Symbolic and artistic references

In November 1960, Anigozanthos manglesii was adopted as the floral emblem of Western Australia in a proclamation made by then Premier of Western Australia David Brand.

It also appears on the armorial bearings of that state, framing the crown in the Coat of arms. This is given to denote the sovereignty and independence of Western Australia.  The blazon reads:
And for Crest: On a Wreath Or and Sable The Royal Crown between two Kangaroo Paw (Anigosanthos [sic] Manglesii) flowers slipped proper.
A red and green kangaroo paw superimposed over a scene of Perth was depicted on a 5 pence on a 1962 Australian stamp issue designed by R. M. Warner to  mark the British Empire and Commonwealth Games held in Perth that year. In 1968 another stamp issue, designed by Nell Wilson, showed the red and green kangaroo paw as part of a series on state floral emblems.

See also
List of Australian floral emblems

Further reading

Notes

References

Extract from Government Gazette (No.95) of 18 November 1960.  PROCLAMATION:
By His Excellency The Honourable Sir John Patric Dwyer, ... Lieutenant-Governor (Lieutenant Governor) in and over the State of Western Australia and its Dependencies in the Commonwealth of Australia.  ...desirable that a floral emblem be adopted as an emblem of the State ... described as Anigosanthos Manglesii D. Don: NOW THEREFORE I, the Lieutenant-Governor, ... Given under my hand and the Public Seal of the said State at Perth, this 9th day of November, 1960.  By His Excellency's Command, David Brand, Premier. God save the Queen !!! (abbreviated and uncorrected text from ANGB)

External links

 Australian Cultivar Registration Authority  (ACRA) - List for genus Anigozanthos, updates the cultivar epithets.

Commelinales of Australia
Angiosperms of Western Australia
manglesii
National symbols of Australia
Garden plants
Endemic flora of Southwest Australia